Simon Brown may refer to:

Simon Brome (died 1603), or Brown, MP for Canterbury
Simon Brown (author) (born 1956), Australian science fiction writer
Simon Brown (cricketer) (born 1969), English cricketer
Simon Brown (footballer, born 1976), English footballer
Simon Brown (footballer, born 1983), English footballer
Simon Brown (boxer) (born 1963), Jamaican boxer
Simon Brown (musician), British composer, singer and conductor
Simon Brown (Massachusetts politician) (1802–1873), Lieutenant Governor for Massachusetts
Simon Brown (skier) (born 1942), Australian Olympic skier
Simon Brown, Baron Brown of Eaton-under-Heywood (born 1937), British judge, Law Lord and member of the British Privy Council
Simon P. Brown (born 1963), English golfer
Simon Brown (rugby league) (born 1989), English rugby league player

See also 
Simon Browne (1680–1732), English dissenting minister and theologian